

Introduction
ACT | The App Association is a trade association with membership including small to mid-sized technology companies and application software developers around the world. The App Association represents entrepreneurs, innovators, and independent developers within the global app ecosystem that engage with verticals across every industry. ACT was founded in 1998 by independent software developers who were concerned that the Microsoft antitrust case would cause a great disruption to the platform for which they wrote software. The organization represents app developers whose issues primarily involve:

1.     A competitive ecosystem in the mobile marketplace providing small and mid-size app developers with equal opportunities

2.     Workforce development and opportunities for the next generation of app developers and technology leaders

3.     Support for intellectual property rights and privacy legislation

4.     Limited government involvement in technology (such as antitrust actions or mandates to use free software/open source software instead of proprietary alternatives), and

5.     Global internet infrastructure that maintains a balance of government regulation and industry interests

The App Association has played a prominent role in educating lawmakers and regulators on technology issues affecting its members, including advocacy for an environment that inspires and rewards innovation while providing resources to help its members leverage their intellectual assets to raise capital, create jobs, and continue innovating in the industry.

The group sponsors hackathons, developer camps, and has annual conferences to encourage app developers to meet and engage with their elected officials in Washington, D.C.

History 

In June 2022, The House Energy and Commerce Subcommittee on Consumer Protection and Commerce issued the following witten testimony by Graham Dufault, senior director for public policy at ACT - The App Association, involving a hybrid hearing on June 14, 2022, entitled "Protecting America's Consumers: Bipartisan Legislation to Strengthen Data Privacy and Security."

In January 2022, The App Association wrote a letter to Senator Durbin and Senator Grassley stating their opposition to Open Apps Market Act due to the security and privacy issues it could introduce, among other things.

In 2015, The App Association launched PiDay.

Since 2015 ACT started lobbying activities in the EU area and began gathering important memberships in companies successfully working in EU software and the field of application production.

Some of the main software houses which joined ACT in Europe are Brightec (UK), Egylis (FR), AppsGarden (PL), Andaman (BE), and Synethsia (the Italian software house which organizes Droidcon Turin).

In 2013, The App Association help rolled out KNOW What’s Inside™ a new program to promote best practices for online privacy in apps for children.

In 2011, The App Association testified before the House Judiciary Committee on children's online privacy protections, before the Senate Judiciary Committee on privacy and location-based services, before the Senate Commerce Committee on mobile privacy issues, and before the House Administration Committee on improving Congress's use of tablets and other paperless communications measures.

In 2010, the App Association testified before the House Judiciary Committee on competition in the mobile marketplace and before the Senate Finance Committee on international trade in the digital economy.

On March 9, 2006, then president of ACT | The App Association, Jonathan Zuck wrote an opinion piece  criticizing the Free Software Foundation's plan to fight digital rights management (DRM) with the new 3.0 version of the GNU General Public License.

Publications 
Throughout the year, ACT will publish a variety of publications covering pressing topics in the app ecosystem.  ACT publications remain some of the most influential and well respected publications for the ecosystem.

All of ACT publications are written and edited by staff and members.

Publications are available at no cost to the industry.

Tech Swamp 

Tech Swamp is published monthly and covers a range of subject areas related to global tech policy and business issues. The hosts discuss how small businesses are impacted by various rules and regulations across the globe and often feature a guest with a policy or technical background.

References

External links
 ACT official web site
 SourceWatch entry for ACT
 ACT | the App Association/Morning Consult Polling: Small Business Growth Depends on Trusted and Secure Marketplaces
 IRS Filings for ACT
 

Information technology organizations
Political advocacy groups in the United States
Lobbying organizations in the United States